Sean Morey may refer to:
Sean Morey (American football) (born 1976), former American football wide receiver 
Sean Morey (comedian), American comedian